Morton Herbert Meyerson  is an American computer industry executive who held positions in the Ross Perot-founded Electronic Data Systems and subsequently at Perot Systems and General Motors. Ross Perot  paid $10 million for naming rights to Morton H. Meyerson Symphony Center, home to the Dallas Symphony Orchestra.

Early life and education
Meyerson was born in Fort Worth, Texas in 1938. His mother was a pianist and actively volunteered at the Fort Worth VA Hospital. His father owned Meyerson insurance company.  When he was 10, Morton's brother Sandy died from cancer.

Meyerson attended Paschal High School, where he played football, sang in the choir, and served as student body president.  He then graduated from The University of Texas at Austin with a Bachelor of Arts degree in economics and philosophy. At UT, he was a member of Sigma Alpha Mu, Texas Cowboys, the UT chorus, and student government.

Career
Meyerson began working for Bell Helicopter in 1963, and then worked at Electronic Data Systems, Inc. from 1966 to 1971, leaving the company as President and Vice Chair.

He was CEO at duPont Glore Forgan from 1971 through 1974.

In 1984, he became the chief technology officer at General Motors. He retired in 1986 to pursue foundation work.

Meyerson mentored Michael Dell during the early years of Dell Computer. He is currently a principal investor in the company RestoraPet and a mentor to its founder, Brian Larsen. From 1992 to 1998, he served as Chair and CEO of Perot Systems. He has since served as Chairman of 2M Companies, Inc.

References

American computer businesspeople
1938 births
Living people